The 2003 Italian Formula Three Championship was the 39th Italian Formula Three Championship season. It began on 30 March at Misano and ended on 12 October at Vallelunga after nine races.

Fausto Ippoliti of Ombra Racing won race at Binetto, race at Magione and another two podiums and ultimately clinched the title. He finished three points clear of Coloni Motorsport driver Christian Montanari, who won race at Mugello and season-ending races at Monza and Vallelunga. Third place went to Lucidi Motors driver Gregory Franchi, who finished ahead of Imola winner Marco Bonanomi.

Teams and drivers

Calendar
All rounds were held in Italy.

Standings
Points are awarded as follows:

References

External links
 Official website

Italian Formula Three Championship seasons
Formula Three
Italian
Italian Formula 3 Championship